Ivan Andreyevich Konovalov (born 18 August 1994) is a Russian football player who plays for Kazakh club Tobol.

Career
Coming from the Fyodor Cherenkov Academy, Konovalov's first role as a senior was as reserve goalkeeper of Russian Premier League sides FC Spartak Moscow and FC Amkar Perm in the seasons 2012–13 and 2013–14, respectively.

He made his professional debut in the Russian Professional Football League for FC SKChF Sevastopol on 3 September 2014 in a game against FC Krasnodar-2.

On 23 July 2015, he signed a 2-year contract with Serbian SuperLiga side FK Radnički Niš.

In January 2017, he signed contract with Serbian SuperLiga side OFK Bačka.

On 29 June 2018, he signed a 4-year contract with the Russian Premier League club FC Rubin Kazan.

On 18 January 2022, Konovalov signed an initial 18-month deal with Scottish Premiership side Livingston, subject to international clearance and obtaining a work permit. Konovalov was the only Russian player in professional league football in the UK at the time. He initially served as a backup to Max Stryjek, but was given an opportunity to play when Stryjek was suspended for two matches.

On 9 February 2023, Kazakhstan Premier League club Tobol announced the signing of Konovalov.

Career statistics

References

External links
 
 

1994 births
People from Balashikha
Living people
Russian footballers
Association football goalkeepers
FC Spartak Moscow players
FC Amkar Perm players
FC Sevastopol (Russia) players
FK Radnički Niš players
OFK Bačka players
FC Torpedo-BelAZ Zhodino players
FC Rubin Kazan players
FC Ural Yekaterinburg players
Russian Premier League players
Russian Second League players
Serbian SuperLiga players
Belarusian Premier League players
Russian expatriate footballers
Expatriate footballers in Serbia
Russian expatriate sportspeople in Serbia
Expatriate footballers in Belarus
Russian expatriate sportspeople in Belarus
Russian expatriate sportspeople in Scotland
Livingston F.C. players
Sportspeople from Moscow Oblast
Expatriate footballers in Scotland
Scottish Professional Football League players